Bob and Mike Bryan were the defending champions and successfully defended the title, defeating Vasek Pospisil and Jack Sock in the final, 6–3, 6–2.

Seeds

Draw

Finals

Top half

Bottom half

References
Main Draw

Western and Southern Open Doubles
2014 Western & Southern Open